The 5th Armored Brigade is an AC/RC (active component/reserve component) unit based at Fort Bliss, Texas. The unit is responsible for training selected United States Army Reserve (USAR) & Army National Guard units west of the Mississippi River before they deploy to conduct combat operations overseas. The unit was formerly designated as 2nd Brigade, 91st Division. In 2006, the brigade trained the Military Transition Teams at Fort Riley before the mission was assigned to the 1st Brigade, 1st Infantry Division. In 2007, the brigade was reassigned from Fort Carson, Colorado to Fort Bliss, Texas.

The brigade was redesignated and re-missioned several times:
5th Tank Destroyer Group 1942–1945 (one of 14 activated for World War II)
5th Armored Cavalry Regiment 1951–1954 (as a USAR unit in Lincoln, Nebraska)
5th Armored Group 1954–1956
5th Brigade (Training) 1975–1995, Lincoln, Nebraska
In 1999 the 5th was merged with the 2d Brigade, 91st Division and carried the latter name and lineage until redesignated in 2006.
In 2015, the 5th absorbed the 402nd Field Artillery Brigade, whose commander assumed command of the merged units.

Organization
The unit is composed of:
  Headquarters & Headquarters Company, 5th Armored Brigade
  CONUS Replacement Center  "Vipers"
  2nd Battalion, 356th Regiment (Logistics Support) "Red Ball"
  1st Battalion, 360th Regiment (Infantry) "WarHawgs"
  3rd Battalion, 360th Regiment (CS/CSS) "Rough Riders"
  1st Battalion, 361st Regiment (Engineers) "Red Hawks"
  3rd Battalion, 361st Regiment (CS/CSS) "Mountain Warriors"
  1st Battalion, 362nd Regiment (Air Defense) "Renegades"
  2nd Battalion, 362nd Regiment (Field Artillery) "Kodiak"
 3rd Battalion, 362nd Regiment (Infantry) "Stallions"
  2nd Battalion, 363rd Regiment (CS/CSS) (Infantry) "Black Scorpion"

Decorations

References

External links
 5th Armored Brigade Official Website
 Lineage & Honors for 2nd Brigade, 91st Division
 Training Division (West)
 The Tank Destroyer Society
 Bibliography for Tank Destroyer research
 Personal recollection from a unit veteran

Military units and formations established in 1942
1942 establishments in the United States
005